Massimo Marconcini (born 8 April 1968) is an Italian rower. He competed in the men's single sculls event at the 1992 Summer Olympics.

References

1968 births
Living people
Italian male rowers
Olympic rowers of Italy
Rowers at the 1992 Summer Olympics
Sportspeople from Livorno